Ivan Kolev Vutsov (14 December 1939 – 18 January 2019) was a Bulgarian football player and coach. His career included periods playing for and later managing the Bulgarian national team.

He played in three matches at the 1966 FIFA World Cup and for Levski Sofia.

Playing career
Vutsov's professional playing career as a defender spanned nearly 15 years, during which he played for three clubs: Botev Plovdiv, Levski Sofia and Akademik Sofia.

He spent nine seasons with Levski where he won two Bulgarian League titles and one Bulgarian Cup.

Vutsov was capped 24 times for the Bulgaria national football team and appeared in the 1966 FIFA World Cup.

He was also a vice president of the Bulgarian Football Union and manager of the Bulgarian national team, Hajduk Split and PFC Levski Sofia where became famous for having 18 games in the European club competitions during his reign. One of the most prominent players he discovered was Alen Bokšić, when managing Hajduk Split. He also held various administrative positions at the Bulgarian Football Union. His son, Velislav Vutsov, is also a former footballer.

Achievements

As player of Levski
 Bulgarian Champion – 1965, 1968
 Bulgarian Cup – 1967

As player of Bulgaria
 1966 FIFA World Cup – 15th Place

As coach of Levski
 Bulgarian Champion – 1979
 Bulgarian Cup – 1976, 1979
 UEFA Cup 1/4 Finalist – 1976

As coach of Bulgaria
 1986 FIFA World Cup – 15th Place

References

External links 
 Profile at LevskiSofia.info

1939 births
2019 deaths
Bulgarian footballers
Botev Plovdiv players
PFC Levski Sofia players
Akademik Sofia players
First Professional Football League (Bulgaria) players
Bulgarian football managers
People from Gabrovo
1966 FIFA World Cup players
1986 FIFA World Cup managers
Bulgaria international footballers
PFC Levski Sofia managers
HNK Hajduk Split managers
Bulgarian expatriate sportspeople in Yugoslavia
Expatriate football managers in Yugoslavia
Aris Thessaloniki F.C. managers
PFC Spartak Varna managers
Bulgaria national football team managers
Bulgarian expatriate football managers
PFC Lokomotiv Plovdiv managers
PFC Slavia Sofia managers
Association football defenders
Expatriate football managers in Greece
Bulgarian expatriate sportspeople in Greece